Batocera maculata  is a species of flat-faced longhorn beetle in the subfamily Lamiinae of the family Cerambycidae. While originally named as "Lamia tigris" by Voet in 1778, no name was validly published for this species until 1817; Voet's 1778 work fails to fulfill the requirement in ICZN Article 11.4 that a work must be consistently binomial, and all names within that work are unavailable.

Description
Batocera maculata is a large long-horn beetle reaching  of length. The body color is quite variable, but usually it is greyish or whitish with dark brown markings. Adults of this widespread species can be seen from April to August.

Distribution
This species is present in Thailand, Malaysia, Sumatra, Java and Borneo.

References

Batocerini
Beetles of Asia
Beetles described in 1817